Vatti is a Chinese company which manufactures kitchen appliances. It manufactures gas hobs, water heaters and extractor fans.

References

Chinese brands
Home appliance manufacturers of China
Companies based in Zhongshan